Red Hawk may refer to:

 Red Hawk (cheese), a triple-crème cow's milk cheese with a brine washed rind
 Rocky the Red Hawk, the mascot of Montclair State University
 Red Hawk, a Sioux chief ca. 1913
 A casino and town of the Shingle Springs Band of Miwok Indians
 Boeing T-7 Red Hawk, a single-engine, tandem seat advanced jet trainer of the United States Air Force
 Development code-name for the RAF's Fireflash missile.

See also

 Red-backed Hawk
 Red-shouldered Hawk
 Red-tailed Hawk
 Redhawk (disambiguation)
 Redhawks (disambiguation)